The 1917 Princeton Tigers football team represented Princeton University in the 1917 college football season. The team finished with a 2–0 record under first-year head coach Keene Fitzpatrick, outscoring opponents by a total of 50 to 0 in games against Fort Dix and Wissahickon Barracks. No Princeton players were selected as first-team honorees on the 1917 College Football All-America Team.

Schedule

References

Princeton
Princeton Tigers football seasons
College football undefeated seasons
Princeton Tigers football